Pennsylvania Route 138 (PA 138) is a  state highway located in Butler County, Pennsylvania. The southern terminus is at PA 8 near West Liberty.  The northern terminus is at PA 38 in North Washington.

Route description

PA 138 begins at an intersection with PA 8 in Clay Township, heading to the northeast on two-lane undivided Euclid Road. The road heads through a mix of farmland and woodland with some homes, reaching the residential community of Euclid. Here, the route passes over the Canadian National's Bessemer Subdivision railroad line and turns east into forested areas with a few residences. PA 138 heads northeast again and enters more agricultural surroundings as it reaches an intersection with PA 308. At this point, PA 138 turns north to form a concurrency with PA 308 on Main Street, heading into the borough of West Sunbury. In this town, the road passes homes. Back into Clay Township, PA 138 splits from PA 308 by heading northeast onto North Washington Road. The road heads through a mix of farms and woods, passing through Concord Township before continuing into Washington Township. PA 138 enters open farmland before reaching its eastern terminus at PA 38 in the residential community of North Washington.

Major intersections

See also

References

External links

Pennsylvania Highways: PA 138

138
Transportation in Butler County, Pennsylvania